Fort Lotfi is a village and military base in the commune of Oum El Assel, in Tindouf Province, Algeria. It is connected to the N50 national highway by a short local road to the northwest.

References 

Neighbouring towns and cities

Populated places in Tindouf Province